Måns Ekvall (born 4 January 1995) is a Swedish footballer who plays for Vasalund.

Club career
On 28 December 2021, Ekvall joined Vasalund for the 2022 season.

References

External links
 
 Måns Ekvall at Eliteprospects.com

1995 births
People from Landskrona Municipality
Footballers from Skåne County
Living people
Swedish footballers
Sweden youth international footballers
Association football midfielders
Helsingborgs IF players
Örgryte IS players
Landskrona BoIS players
Vasalunds IF players
Allsvenskan players
Ettan Fotboll players
Superettan players